Seiji Ara (荒 聖治; Ara Seiji) (born May 5, 1974 in Chiba, Japan) is a Japanese race car driver.

He was the winner of the 24-hour Le Mans race in 2004, driving an Audi R8. In the same year he also raced in the Le Mans Endurance Series and Japanese GT Championship.

In earlier years he had competed in Formula Nippon (2001–2002), Japanese Formula 3 (1997–2000) and the Barber Dodge Pro Series (1995).

He made his World Touring Car Championship debut with Wiechers-Sport at the 2009 FIA WTCC Race of Japan.

Racing record

24 Hours of Le Mans results

Complete GT1 World Championship results

Complete JGTC/Super GT results
(key) (Races in bold indicate pole position) (Races in italics indicate fastest lap)

* Season still in progress.

Complete Formula Nippon results
(key) (Races in bold indicate pole position) (Races in italics indicate fastest lap)

References

Living people
1974 births
Sportspeople from Chiba Prefecture
Japanese racing drivers
Formula Nippon drivers
24 Hours of Le Mans drivers
24 Hours of Le Mans winning drivers
World Touring Car Championship drivers
European Le Mans Series drivers
FIA GT1 World Championship drivers
FIA World Endurance Championship drivers
Blancpain Endurance Series drivers
Barber Pro Series drivers
24H Series drivers
Super GT drivers
Oreca drivers
TOM'S drivers
Kondō Racing drivers
Audi Sport drivers
Pescarolo Sport drivers
Boutsen Ginion Racing drivers